Andreas Ludwig Leitgeb was a mayor of Vienna.

References 

Mayors of Vienna
18th-century Austrian people